Mohammad Kabir is an Afghan cricketer. He made his first-class debut for Boost Region in the 2017–18 Ahmad Shah Abdali 4-day Tournament on 25 November 2017. He made his List A debut for Herat Province in the 2019 Afghanistan Provincial Challenge Cup tournament on 1 August 2019.

References

External links
 

Year of birth missing (living people)
Living people
Afghan cricketers
Boost Defenders cricketers
Place of birth missing (living people)